"If U Stay Ready" is the first single released from Suga Free's first studio album, Street Gospel. It features Playa Hamm and is produced by DJ Quik, Robert "Fonksta" Bacon and G-One. The song was used on the How to Be a Player soundtrack.

Track listing 
Vinyl, 12", promo
"On My Way (Clean)" (featuring El DeBarge) - 4:29
"On My Way (Instrumental)" - 4:27
"I'd Rather Give You My Bitch" - 5:04
"If U Stay Ready (DJ Quik Remix)" - 5:03
"Why You Bullshittin'" - 4:25
"Tip Toe (LP Version)" (featuring DJ Quik) - 5:16

CD single
"If U Stay Ready (Clean Radio Edit)" - 4:25
"If U Stay Ready (LP Version)" - 4:45
"If U Stay Ready (TV Version)" - 4:24
"Fly Fo Life (LP Version)" - 4:46

Chart performance

References

1997 singles
Song recordings produced by DJ Quik
Song recordings produced by G-One